Katya is a feminine given name. It is a very popular name in Russia, Ukraine, Bulgaria, Serbia, and North Macedonia. It is a Russian diminutive form of Yekaterina, which is a Russian form of Katherine. The name is sometimes used as an independent given name in the English-speaking world. In German, Dutch and Scandinavian languages it is spelled Katja. For origin and meaning see also Indian literature for the name Katya-yani/Katyayani, possibly the oldest and therefore the origin of the name Katya. Katya may also refer to:

In the arts:
 Katya Chilly (born 1978), Ukrainian singer
 Katya Jones (born 1989), Russian dancer
 Katya Medvedeva (born 1937), Russian naïve painter
 Katya Paskaleva (1945–2002), Bulgarian actress
 Katya Reimann (born 1965), American writer of fantasy novels
 Katya Santos (born 1982), Filipina actress and model
 Katya Zamolodchikova, (performed by Brian McCook, born 1982), American drag queen

In other fields:
 Katya Adler, British journalist
 Yekaterina Budanova (1916–1943), also known as Katya, female Soviet fighter ace in the Second World War
 Katya Scheinberg, Russian-American applied mathematician

In fiction:
 Katya Derevko, on the ABC television series Alias
 Katya Kinski, on the Australian soap opera Neighbours
 Katya Nadanova, Bond girl in the game James Bond 007: Everything or Nothing
 Katya Orlova, heroine of John le Carré's novel The Russia House and the film adaptation
 Katya Vogt, the protagonist of Sandra Birdsell's historical novel The Russländer (aka Katya)
 Katya (Highlander), an Immortal in Highlander: The Series
 Katya, a character in the 2013 movie Stalingrad.
 Katya Udinov, Alexandra Udinov's mother in Nikita

Other uses
Katya (spider), a genus of spiders

References

Russian feminine given names
Slavic feminine given names
Arabic feminine given names
Bulgarian feminine given names
Macedonian feminine given names
Serbian feminine given names

Ukrainian feminine given names
Slovene feminine given names
Croatian feminine given names

ar:كاتيا
da:Katja
de:Katja
ru:Катя
fi:Katja
sv:Katja